Bid Karz (also Romanized as Bīd Karz; also known as Bīkārez, Bikarz, Bīkasr, and Bīkaz) is a village in Mishan Rural District, Mahvarmilani District, Mamasani County, Fars Province, Iran. At the 2006 census, its population was 463, in 103 families.

References 

Populated places in Mamasani County